Horatius Palmer Jenkins (June 15, 1891 – March 1, 1962) was an American Negro league outfielder between 1910 and 1921.

Early life and career
A native of Nashville, Tennessee, Jenkins attended Hyde Park Academy High School in Chicago, Illinois. He made his Negro leagues debut in 1910 for the Chicago Giants. Jenkins went on to play for the Chicago Union Giants and Chicago American Giants, and finished his career back with the Chicago Giants from 1919 to 1921. He died in Manteno, Illinois in 1962 at age 70.

References

External links
 and Baseball-Reference Black Baseball stats and Seamheads

Further reading
 Defender staff (October 12, 1918). "Baseball Shrapnel". The Chicago Defender. p. 9
 Defender staff (February 21, 1920). "Baseball Men Write League Constitution". The Chicago Defender. p. 9

1891 births
1962 deaths
Chicago American Giants players
Chicago Giants players
Baseball outfielders
Baseball players from Nashville, Tennessee
20th-century African-American sportspeople